Irrespective of the native-language meaning of the Mantra, the standard English translation neutralises the implied gender of God in Sikhism.

Gurū Granth
The scripture of Sikhism is the Gurū Granth (GG). Printed as a heading for the Guru Granth, and for each of its major divisions, is the Mul Mantra, a short summary description of God, in Punjabi. Sikh tradition has it that this was originally composed by Nanak Dev (1469–1539), the founder of Sikhism.

ISO 15919: 
English: One Universal God, The Name Is Truth, Creative Being Personified, No Fear, No Hatred, Image Of The Timeless One, Beyond Birth, Self-Existent, By Guru's Grace.

Purakhu
The sixth word of the mantra, purakhu, is the Punjabi form of Sanskrit  (पुरुष), meaning man (personal and male). Verse 5 of a 16-verse hymn in the 10th mandala (or cycle) of the Sanskrit Rgveda (RV) called puruṣa sūkta, speaks of a primal man, Puruṣa, from whom Viraj (woman) was born, being himself then reborn of her.

From him Viraj was born; again Purusa from Viraj was born.
The masculine gender sense of purakhu in the Mantra is found in a verse like the following.
That house, in which the soulbride has married her Husband Lord—in that house, O my companions, sing the songs of rejoicing.
You are the Husband Lord, and I am the soul-bride.

In Sikhism, a person has two genders - one the physical gender i.e. sex (male or female), and the other the spiritual gender (which is always female - regardless of a person's physical sex). Waheguru is alluded culturally as the spiritual husband, reunion with Which is the desire of every spiritual bride - all of us.

In attachment to Maya, they have forgotten the Father, the Cherisher of the World.
You are our Self-sufficient Father. || 2 || O Father, I do not know—how can I know Your Way? 
You are the Universal Father of all, O my Lord and Master.
Some references are inclusive, where God is both Mother and Father.
The One is my Brother, the One is my Friend. The One is my Mother and Father. The One is the Support of the mind; He has given us body and soul. May I never forget God from my mind; He holds all in the Power of His Hands.
Relying on Your Mercy, Dear Lord, I have indulged in sensual pleasures. Like a foolish child, I have made mistakes. O Lord, You are my Father and Mother.
There is at least one reference to God as Mother, without reference to a Father.
"O my wandering mind, you are like a camel - how will you meet the Lord, your Mother?" 

This overly literal interpretation of the cultural references in the Guru Granth Sahib run counter to the basic premise of the Mool Mantar - that God has no form. Hence, an anthropomorphic religious (as opposed to cultural) interpretation is a contradiction in terms. The inherent anti-anthropomorphism of Sikhism scuttles any idea of religious gender of Waheguru. The God in sikhism is considered as jot saroop(luminescence of light) so no question of gender but depending upon the feeling of the devotee God can turn itself to any shape a child(girl or boy), a young man or woman, old man or woman or whatever he desire to be i.e. he is not governed by any law or rule and he free to do anything. So in Sikhism, God is considered to be without form or gender and can't be described.

References

Sikh beliefs